Randolph FitzGerald Samuel (born 23 December 1963) is a Trinidad-born Canadian former soccer player who played as a defender. His 82 international caps were a Canada national team record until he was surpassed by Paul Stalteri in September 2010.

He started his career with the Edmonton Eagles and Vancouver Whitecaps, before joining Dutch champions PSV Eindhoven in 1985. Playing just five Eredivisie games for PSV, he moved on to FC Volendam in 1987, becoming a key member of the team until he moved on to league rivals Fortuna Sittard in 1990. Sittard were relegated into the second tier, and Samuel moved on to English side Port Vale in November 1995. Failing to make an impact in England, he left in May 1996, and signed with Norwegian side Harstad IL. He later played for the Vancouver 86ers, the Hampton Roads Mariners, and the Montreal Impact.

Making 82 appearances for Canada between 1983 and 1997, he appeared in all three games of the 1986 FIFA World Cup. He also helped his nation to win the 1990 North American Nations Cup and 1985 CONCACAF Championship. He played at the CONCACAF Gold Cup in 1991 and 1993. In 2012 as part of the Canadian Soccer Association's centennial celebration, he was named to the all-time Canada XI men's team.

Club career

North America
Samuel, born in Trinidad, grew up in Richmond, British Columbia, and graduated from McNair High School. He was selected by the Vancouver Whitecaps in the 1981 North American Soccer League draft, though he never signed with the club. In 1983, Samuel began his professional career with the Edmonton Eagles of the Canadian Professional Soccer League. He signed with the Vancouver Whitecaps the following year, yet he never played a game for them before returning to the Eagles.

Netherlands
In 1985, Samuels left Canada for the Netherlands where he played in the Dutch First Division with PSV Eindhoven. PSV were crowned champions in 1985–86 and 1986–87, but Samuels played just five league games before he moved on to FC Volendam, who were newly promoted to the top-flight in 1987–88. After a mid-table finish in 1988–89, Volendam missed out on qualification to the UEFA Cup by only two points in 1989–90. He switched to Fortuna Sittard in 1990, who finished mid-table in 1990–91 and 1991–92, before dropping into the Second Division after suffering relegation in 1992–93. After Sittard finished the 1993–94 season mid-table in the Dutch second tier he left both the club and the country.

England
After a trial at English Football League First Division side Port Vale, he signed forms with the club in November 1995. He got off to a flying start, scoring on his debut, in a 1–1 draw with Watford at Vale Park on 18 November 1995. By the end of the year he was out of action due to a knee injury. He recovered, but failed to return to the first team and was released by manager John Rudge in May 1996, having made just ten appearances in 1995–96.

Norway and back to North America
He then moved out to Norway, and played for First Division side Harstad IL in 1997. The club were relegated and the next year he moved back to Canada to sign with the Vancouver 86ers of the A-League. The 86ers qualified for the Western Conference quarter-finals in 1998, where they were defeated by the San Diego Flash. Samuels returned to Harstad in 1999, now in Group 8 of the Norwegian Second Division.

In 2000, he returned to the North American A-League, and spent the 2000 season with the Hampton Roads Mariners, who lost to the Richmond Kickers at the Eastern Conference quarter-finals. He finished his professional playing career with the Montreal Impact, playing four games of their 2001 season.

International career
Samuel earned his first cap for Canada in a 3–1 loss to Honduras in San Pedro Sula on 11 November 1983. After a further ten appearances in friendly games, the only victory coming against his birth nation Trinidad and Tobago, he played seven of Canada's eight games at the 1985 CONCACAF Championship; they finished above Honduras and Costa Rica in the final round to claim the nation's first major honour in the sport since the 1904 Olympics. Their success won them a place at the 1986 World Cup finals – thus far the country's only appearance at the World Cup finals. Samuel played all three of Canada's games in Mexico; a 1–0 defeat to France and 2–0 defeats to Hungary and the Soviet Union.

Canada missed out on qualification to the 1989 CONCACAF Championship after losing to Guatemala on away goals. Samuel continued to feature regularly though, and appeared in the 1990 North American Nations Cup, which Canada won. He went on to play two of Canada's three games at the 1991 CONCACAF Gold Cup.

He played five of Canada's six group games in the First Round of 1994 World Cup qualification, as they finished ahead of Jamaica and Bermuda to qualify for the final round of group games. He played each of the two games against Mexico, El Salvador and Honduras; they finished second behind the Mexicans, meaning they had to beat Australia in a CONCACAF–OFC play-off in order to qualify. Before this game was the 1993 CONCACAF Gold Cup; Samuels played all three of Canada's games, including the 8–0 capitulation to Mexico in front of 70,000 Mexicans at the Estadio Azteca – the biggest defeat in Canada's history was their last game before the all important match with Australia. Samuel did not feature in the 2–1 win at the Commonwealth Stadium, but did play in the second leg at the Sydney Football Stadium. The Aussies won 2–1 to take the game to a penalty shoot-out, which the "Canucks" lost 4–1.

Samuel won the final fourteen caps of his thirteen-year international career in qualification for the 1998 World Cup. He played all six of the initial group stage games, as Canada finished ahead of El Salvador, Panama and Cuba. He then played eight of Canada's ten games in the final round of qualifying, as they finished bottom of the group behind Mexico, the United States, Jamaica, Costa Rica and El Salvador. He made his final appearance for his nation in the 3–1 defeat to the Costa Ricans in San José on 16 November 1997.

His 82 international caps were a Canadian national team record until he was surpassed by Paul Stalteri in September 2010. Samuel was inducted into the Canada Soccer Hall of Fame in 2006.

Coaching career
In 2010, he was appointed Head coach of Lobbans FC in the Vancouver Metro Soccer League. He now also runs his own soccer business in Surrey, British Columbia.

Career statistics

Club

International

Honours
PSV Eindhoven
Eredivisie: 1985–86, 1986–87

Canada
CONCACAF Gold Cup: 1985
North American Nations Cup: 1990

References

External links
 / Canada Soccer Hall of Fame

1963 births
Living people
People from Richmond, British Columbia
Black Canadian soccer players
Soccer people from British Columbia
Trinidad and Tobago emigrants to Canada
Canada men's youth international soccer players
Canada men's international soccer players
Canadian soccer players
Canadian expatriate soccer players
Canada Soccer Hall of Fame inductees
CONCACAF Championship-winning players
Association football defenders
Edmonton Eagles players
Canadian expatriate sportspeople in the United States
Vancouver Whitecaps (1974–1984) players
Expatriate footballers in the Netherlands
Canadian expatriate sportspeople in the Netherlands
Eredivisie players
PSV Eindhoven players
FC Volendam players
Fortuna Sittard players
Expatriate footballers in England
Port Vale F.C. players
Expatriate footballers in Norway
Canadian expatriate sportspeople in Norway
Harstad IL players
Vancouver Whitecaps (1986–2010) players
Virginia Beach Mariners players
Montreal Impact (1992–2011) players
1986 FIFA World Cup players
1991 CONCACAF Gold Cup players
1993 CONCACAF Gold Cup players
Canadian Professional Soccer League (original) players
English Football League players
A-League (1995–2004) players
Canadian soccer coaches
Canadian expatriate sportspeople in England